The fourth season of The Real Housewives of Dallas, an American reality television series, is broadcast on Bravo. It premiered on September 4, 2019, and is primarily filmed in Dallas, Texas. Its executive producers are Adam Karpel, Andrew Hoegl, John Paparazzo, Rich Bye, Samantha Billett and Andy Cohen.

The Real Housewives of Dallas focuses on the lives of Stephanie Hollman, LeeAnne Locken, Brandi Redmond, D'Andra Simmons, Kameron Westcott and Kary Brittingham.

Episodes

References 

The Real Housewives of Dallas
2019 American television seasons
2020 American television seasons